Melway, colloquially referred to as Melways or The Melways, is a street directory for Melbourne, Victoria, Australia and its immediate surrounds, including the city of Geelong. Formerly a highly ubiquitous directiory, Melway is currently in its 48th edition—the 2021 edition— released in July 2020.

History
Merv Godfrey and another partner conceived Melway in the 1950s. Sadly, that partner died in 1961. Godfrey set out to secure a new partner, and found Iven Mackay. Together, they developed the first Melway. After five years of work and research, the first edition was released in May 1966. Some sceptics felt that Melway would fail to sell because its price at the time was $2.50, nearly twice that of its nearest competitor. All of the 106 original maps were hand-drawn in ink. First editions of Melway can sell for around $500 on the second-hand market. A reprint of the first edition was released in 2012 and can be purchased from Melway for $150. The original maps from the first edition can be viewed online via a clickable map.

By the early 1980s, Melway was the most popular street directory in Melbourne, holding over 80 per cent of the market; indeed "Melway" had begun to be used as a generic term for any street directory. The current RRP for a 2017 Melway is $62.95, but many retailers sell Melway for around $40.

In 1982, after the fourteenth edition of Melway had been released, it was awarded the International Cartographic Association Excellence Award, as well as the inaugural award for Cartographic Excellence from the Australian Institute of Cartographers. Ausway won the Australian award again in 1994 for its first edition of Sydway.

Most motorists in Melbourne have a copy of Melway, as do many taxi drivers, bus drivers and some hire cars. The Victoria Police, fire brigade, ambulance service, Victorian State Emergency Service, St John Ambulance Victoria and for the State government car fleet officially use Melway. Its main competitor is UBD-Gregory's, which is the most popular brand in all other states and territories.<ref> The development of section 46 in Australia: Melway and its likely impact on business – November 2000 Given the national scope of Universal Press's dominance in most city markets (except Melbourne) it is not improbable or even unlikely that it could, if it was worth its while, engage in an extensive advertising or marketing campaign to attempt to make more of an impact in this one market where it holds insignificant market share.</ref>

Features

While primarily a street directory, Melway editions also contain details on public transport (train, tram, and bus routes, tickets and prices), bicycle paths, suburb and postcode details, public parks and reserves, landmarks (such as commercial buildings, telephone boxes, pubs and restaurants), attractions, and also boat mooring details in recognised docks.

In addition to the blue-bordered and red-bordered street maps, there are yellow-bordered maps of university campuses and crematoria. Moreover, there are also green-bordered maps showing routes through the country to Adelaide and Sydney. Many versions of the street directory are obtainable, usually in standard or large-print editions, wall-charts, or an online catalogue.

Grid references
In Melbourne it is common for a Melway reference (in the format Map—Grid reference, e.g., 59 K5) to be given along with directions on, for example, an event notice or real estate advertisement. It is generally assumed that everyone has, or has access to, a copy of the directory in Melbourne. By comparison, the UBD reference for a particular "Melways reference" (as it is colloquially known) can be significantly different, but is rarely (if ever) provided. It is generally assumed that all such references, regardless of whether it is explicitly stated or not, are from the Melway directory and not from the UBD. The reverse is true in all other states and territories.

Some organisations provide a Melway year of publication in addition to their map reference (e.g., (2006) 70 F6), to avoid confusion if map references change in newer versions of the directory. However, Melway has kept the need for this to an absolute minimum over the years. It has held off several cartographic features, including a more logical overall tiling of pages across the entire metropolitan area (which do appear in the Sydway and Brisway). That is to protect the integrity and continuity of the original 1966 grid references.

Cartography
One of the distinguishing differences of a Melway-style map from other Australian street directories is in the rendering of roads. Rather than the traditional drawing of two lines with the road name printed in-between, (known as "double casing") Melway maps show a single line with the name above or below the road, in many colours reflecting the identity or usage of the road. This allows for much more detail to fit into the same size map, as well as showing dual carriageways, slip lanes, service roads, speed bumps, roundabouts, and other useful information.

UBD has copied this difference in their Melbourne directory, in a bid to capitalise on the familiarity of Melway. UBD has only attempted this in the Melbourne directory, retaining their usual format for their other directories. The map design was first fully completed by computers in 2000.

Editions
There have been 48 editions of Melway since the mid-1960s. A new edition is typically released late one year and denoted as being for the following year. For example, edition 35 was released in August 2007 and denoted as the 2008 Melway. Despite this discrepancy, numerous roads and other features under construction or proposal are included (e.g.Eastlink in the 35th edition). Therefore, editions dating up to 5 or even ten years old could still remain useful.

List of editions
Below is a list of Melway editions, the years they were released, their price at the time of release and other information and introduced features:

1 1966 ($2.50) All maps from this edition, as well as editions 2–5, can be viewed online for free via a clickable map
2 1968 (central Melbourne map introduced) ($2.70)
3 1969 (postcode boundaries, house numbers and 10 new maps)
4 1970 (11 new maps)
5 1971 (over-dimensional route maps)
6 1973 (enlarged university maps)
7 1974 (45 new maps including Mornington Peninsula, 4,000 new streets)
8 1975 ($4.95, 750 new streets)
9 1976 (traffic lights, 20 new maps)
10 1977 (36 new maps including Bacchus Marsh & Geelong, kindergartens, RSL clubs)
11 1978 (4m clearance bridges, taxi & car hire)
12 1979 (rescaling to metric)
13 1980 (public transport section, bus routes)
14 1982 (inner city maps, bicycle paths, Bellarine Peninsula maps)
15 1984 (inner Geelong maps, Victorian Arts Centre enlarged map)
16 1986 (9 new maps including Warburton)
17 1987
18 1988 (large print edition first published)
19 1989 (28 new maps, Yarra Glen and Phillip Island)
20 1990 (central Melbourne mobility map)
21 1991 (bus routes reintroduced, 30 new maps including 18 touring maps, Australia map)
22 1993 (36 new maps, Dandenong, Frankston, and Melbourne Airport enlarged maps)
23 1994 (24 new maps including Sunbury, Craigieburn and Healesville, cross referencing, new council boundaries)
24 1996 (enlarged CBD maps, 9 new maps, fire, water and electricity authority boundaries, CityLink)
25 1997 (enlarged Southbank maps, enlarged Kensington and Footscray maps)
26 1998 (24 new maps including Greater Geelong, Doreen, Mernda, and Docklands boundaries)
27 1999 (for 2000, enlarged maps of St Kilda, new suburb boundaries)
28 2000 (for 2001, every map computer generated, hook turns, official suburb names, boundaries and postcodes)
29 2001 (for 2002, 29 new maps, expanded coverage of Werribee, dog prohibited areas)
30 2002 (for 2003, 17 new maps including Lorne, Nar Nar Goon and Tynong, Queenscliff enlargement, bicycle facilities)
31 2003 (for 2004, GPS compatible, enlarged maps of Box Hill and Moonee Ponds, marine parks, shared bicycle road routes)
32 2004 (for 2005, 12 new maps including Wollert and Eynesbury, Eastern Ring Road route, Avalon Airport facilities)
33 2005 (for 2006, new hierarchy of roads, Craigieburn Bypass)
34 2006 (for 2007, Flemington Racecourse enlargement)
35 2007 (for 2008, eWay electronic street directory released)
36 2008 (for 2009, petrol stations, speed and red light cameras, EastLink fully detailed) includes Melway Ballarat Edition 1
37 2009 (for 2010, new maps for Beveridge, proposed Peninsula Link alignment)
38 2010 (for 2011, Peninsula Link alignment under construction, proposed Outer Ring Road and rail corridor)
39 2011 (for 2012, new maps for Macedon, Mount Macedon, Riddells Creek and Bannockburn)
40 2012 (for 2013, the completed link between the Geelong Ring Road and Princes Highway, the route of the proposed link between the Surf Coast Highway and Anglesea Road, and the new Geelong suburbs of Armstrong Creek and Charlemont)
41 2013 (for 2014, includes Kilmore, the proposed link between the Surf Coast Highway and Anglesea Road and the completed Peninsula Link)
42 2014 (for 2015, includes Koo Wee Rup)
43 2015 (for 2016) including 900 more streets and update on the purposed West Gate Distributor.
44 2016 (for 2017) with 1100 additional street listings and 500 updated maps.
45 2017 (for 2018) includes over 2600 additional streets, 500 revised maps and updates on the West Gate Tunnel as well as the Melbourne Metro Rail Channel.
46 2018 (for 2019) featuring 1000 more street listings.
47 2019 (for 2020) with 500 revised/updated maps totalling 2000 further street listings, and updates on the Level Crossing Removal Project, Metro Tunnel, North East Link and Drysdale Bypass.
48 2020 (for 2021) featuring 1700 additional street listings and expanded coverages of Cardinia, Pakenham South and Wallan.

Expansion into other Australian markets

Melway has spawned an umbrella company known as Ausway, which started producing directories for other cities and towns from the early 1990s onwards. These other directories include:Sydway – Sydney, introduced 1994Sydway: Central Coast – Central Coast, New South Wales region, introduced 1999Brisway – Brisbane, Queensland introduced 2005Ballarat Special Edition Melway – introduced 2008Melway Perth'' – Perth, Western Australia, introduced 2010.

References

External links
Melway official website
View maps from the current edition
View maps from Melway Editions 1–5
Melway online

Transport in Melbourne
Street directories